A tank transporter is a combination of a heavy tractor unit and a mating full trailer or semi-trailer (typically of the "lowboy" type), used for transporting tanks and other armoured fighting vehicles. Some also function as tank recovery vehicles, the tractors of which may be armoured for protection in combat conditions.

Used on roads, tank transporters reduce the wear and tear on tracks and the other components of the powertrains of tracked vehicles. They also conserve fuel, are less damaging of road surfaces, and reduce tank crew fatigue.  Overall, they are more efficient at moving tanks at higher speeds and longer distances than the tanks themselves.

Chassis designs
Three chassis designs have been used, generally in this order over time as loads became heavier, although there are exceptions.

Rigid chassis

The lighter tanks of World War I and the interwar period were carried on simple rigid flatbed lorries.

Trailers

As the weight of tanks became too great for lorry chassis, separate trailers were developed. These carried the entire weight of the tank on their own wheels, putting no weight onto the tractor unit. They are pulled by a ballast tractor connected to a drawbar.

The simplest trailer designs have only two axles, but heavier loads frequently require more than this. Multiple wheels per axle are common, usually four, sometimes eight.

One advantage of ballast tractors is that they are capable of double heading, where two tractor units are coupled to pull a particularly heavy trailer.

Other attempts have been made around 1942 with heavy-trucks as known for the Dart T13 Tank Tractor.

Steering
Some designs, such as the 1928 Aldershot design, grouped pairs of axles at each end of the trailer.

Others, such as the 70-ton Cranes trailer used to carry the Second World War-era  Tortoise heavy assault tank had five axles, spaced along the length of the trailer. The end-wheel designs have the advantages of better ability to cross rough ground and steering more easily. Those with axles throughout their length must have suspension that allows the axles to move and also allowing some steering. This makes them more complicated to manufacture. Placing the wheels at the ends also allows the chassis to dip down into a "well", giving a lower centre of gravity during transport. The Cranes trailer had a frame split into two sections of two and three axles, with a carrying bed above them. The outermost four axles had Ackermann steering for their wheels.

The German Sd.Ah.116 trailer of World War II had a steersman's position on the rear bogie.

Semi-trailers

The ballast tractor for a drawbar trailer must be comparable in weight to its load if it is to have traction, which means that the total weight of the tractor-trailer combination might be as much as twice the useful load. By using a semi-trailer instead, some of the load's weight is instead carried by the tractor. This avoids the need to ballast the tractor, making a greater proportion of the total weight available for the load.

Semi-trailers cannot be moved on their own, or pushed and pulled by ballast tractors. They are only mobile when connected to the correct tractor unit, which can limit their use in recovery.

The simplest semi-trailer is "half of a trailer", having wheels at the rear only and an articulated connection to the tractor unit. A strong metal post or kingpin on the trailer fits into a socket or 'fifth wheel' on the tractor.

Lowboy semi-trailers are commonly used to keep the load's center of mass low, as they have a low horizontal bed, with a gooseneck that rises up at the front to connect to the tractor unit.

As with drawbar trailers, it is simplest if all the axles of a semi-trailer are concentrated at the rear, away from the tractor unit. However, heavier loads may require more axles, and steering gear may be needed at the front of the semi-trailer.

Loading

Ramps 
The simplest means of loading the transporter is with a pair of hinged ramps at the rear. The load then drives up the ramps and onto the trailer under its own power. As tracked vehicles exist for their mobility across obstacles, they usually have no difficulty in doing this (however, see the "Power for loading" section below.)

Tilt beds
The Cranes trailer described above uses an entire see-saw tilting bed (and two small ramps). A manual hydraulic pump tilts the empty bed, bringing the loading end close to the ground. The tank drives up, then once past the see-saw fulcrum the bed tilts back under its weight.

Demountable axles

Some designs use a demountable axle, where the axle detaches from the bed of the trailer. Access to the load bed is now through low ramps, without needing to climb over the height of the wheels. Again, the intention is to keep centre of gravity low.

Power for loading

Although an operational vehicle can be driven on-board under its own power, this is a delicate operation, particularly with tracked vehicles, as their precise steering is limited. In particular, neutral steering, where one track goes forward and one backward causing the tank to turn on the spot, is likely to either damage the trailer bed or to cause the vehicle to fall off.

A few transporters have been fitted with winches for loading, but this is uncommon. More commonly a disabled vehicle is loaded with the assistance of a recovery tractor, either winching or pushing it on board.

Tank recovery vehicles

Some tank transports are equipped with winches or cranes to also serve as tank recovery vehicles. Some are armoured recovery vehicles. Tanks are usually deployed in groups, with an equal number of transporters to support them. Recovery vehicles are more complex and more expensive and thus only a limited number are produced.

For similar reasons, tank transporters are rarely armoured to recover tanks under fire, although tracked recovery vehicles frequently are. A rare few have been, such as the M26 "Dragon Wagon" of World War II.

Individual models

See also 

 Artillery tractor
 Flatcar - used to transport tanks where railroad tracks are available
 List of U.S. military vehicles by model number

Notes

References

External links

 
Military trucks